AA, Aa, Double A, or Double-A may refer to:

Arts, entertainment and media 
 America's Army, a 2002 computer game published by the U.S. Army
 Ancient Anguish, a computer game in existence since 1992
 Aa!, a J-Pop musical group
 Double-A (band), stylised as AA, South Korean boy band
 Aa (album), a 2016 album by Baauer
 AA (song), a 2021 single by Walker Hayes
 Ace Attorney, a series of video games developed by Capcom.
AA Films, an Indian film distribution company
AA Book (disambiguation)
AA, the production code for the 1966 Doctor Who serial The Savages

Brands, organizations and enterprises 
 Alcoholics Anonymous, an international fellowship dedicated to helping alcoholics peer to peer in sobriety
 A. A. Arms, a defunct firearms manufacturer
 Aerolíneas Argentinas, an Argentine airline (logo used to consist of two A's)
 Air Asia, an Asian multinational low cost carrier
 Air Austral, flag carrier airline of Reunion (logo used to consist of two A’s)
 Alcoa, an American aluminum-producing company (stock symbol AA)
 American Airlines, major American full-service airline (logo used to consist of two A’s)
 Anadolu Agency, a state-run press agency in Turkey
 Audio-Animatronics, used at the Disney Parks
 Academia de Artes, Mexico
 Amalgamated Association of Iron and Steel Workers, a former union in the United States
 Andecha Astur, an Asturian nationalist party
 Architectural Association School of Architecture, London, United Kingdom
 Astrological Association of Great Britain, London, United Kingdom
 Auswärtiges Amt, the Foreign Office of Germany
 Danish Association of Architects (Akademisk Arkitektforening)
 The AA (formerly The Automobile Association), a British motoring organization
 AA Ireland, an Irish  automotive services company
 AA Motoring Trust, a former British road safety charity operated by The AA that was merged to form the IAM Motoring Trust

Philosophy and religion 
 A∴A∴, a spiritual organization created in 1907 by Aleister Crowley
 Abhisamayalankara, or Abhisamaya-alaṅkāra, a Mahayana Buddhist text
 Augustinians of the Assumption, a congregation of Catholic religious (priests and brothers)
 Statue of A'a from Rurutu, a wooden fertility-god sculpture from the Pacific island of Rurutu
 "A is A", an expression of the law of identity: each thing is identical with itself

Language 
 aa, Latin-script digraph used in the orthographies of Dutch, Finnish and other languages
 aa, representation of letter Å in several Scandinavian languages
 aa, a romanization of Arabic letter alif ا
 Ꜳ, an orthographic ligature
 Afar language (ISO 639-1 language code aa)
 Aa (Bengali), a Bengali letter

Measurements
 AA, a bra size
 AA, a width in shoe sizes
 AA battery size

Nature 
 Aa (plant), a genus of orchid
 Aa (snail), a subgenus of snail 
 ʻAʻā or aa, a form of lava
 A term for "river" in German hydronymy, see Aach (toponymy)

People 
 Aa (surname), a Scandinavian surname, including a list of people with this name
 Van der Aa (surname), a Dutch surname, including a list of people with this name
 Aa (architect), an architect in ancient Egypt
 Anthony Armstrong (writer) (1897–1972), Anglo-Canadian writer who used the pseudonym A.A.

Places
 Aa, Estonia, a village and beach in Estonia
 Aa, Indonesia, a populated place in the South Sulawesi province of Indonesia
 Ann Arbor, a city in Michigan, United States of America

Rivers

Belgium 
Aa (Nete), a river in the province of Antwerp, which joins the Nete

France 
Aa (France), a river in northern France

Germany 
Aabach (Afte), formerly called the Große Aa, a river in North Rhine-Westphalia
Aa (Möhne), a river in North Rhine-Westphalia
Aa (Nethe), a river in North Rhine-Westphalia
Aa (Werre), a river in North Rhine-Westphalia
Bocholter Aa, a river in North Rhine-Westphalia
Dreierwalder Aa, a river in North Rhine-Westphalia
Kleine Aa (Aabach), a tributary of the Aabach in North Rhine-Westphalia
Große Aa, a tributary of the Ems in Lower Saxony
Große Aa (Aabach), a tributary of the Aabach in North Rhine-Westphalia
Münstersche Aa, a river in North Rhine-Westphalia
Schaler Aa, a river in Lower Saxony and North Rhine-Westphalia
Speller Aa, a river in Lower Saxony and North Rhine-Westphalia
Steinfurter Aa, a river in North Rhine-Westphalia

Netherlands 
Aa (Meuse), a river in North Brabant, which joins the Dommel to form the Dieze
Aa of Weerijs, a river in North Brabant, which joins the Mark at Breda
Drentsche Aa, a river in Drenthe and Groningen
Mussel Aa, a river in Westerwolde, Groningen
 , a river in Westerwolde, Groningen
Westerwoldsche Aa, a river near Oudeschans, Groningen

Switzerland 
Aabach (Aare), a tributary of the Aare in canton of Aargau
Aabach (Greifensee), or Ustermer Aa, a river in canton of Zürich
Aabach (Obersee), a tributary of Obersee (Zürichsee), in canton of St. Gallen
Aabach (Seetal), a river in the cantons of Lucerne and Aargau, runs through Lake Hallwyl
Chli Aa (Sempachersee), a tributary of Lake Sempach in the canton of Lucerne
Engelberger Aa, a river in the cantons of Obwalden and Nidwalden, tributary of Lake Lucerne
Gross Aa (Sempachersee), a tributary of Lake Sempach in the canton of Lucerne
Mönchaltorfer Aa, a tributary of Greifensee in canton of Zürich
Sarner Aa (river), a river in Obwalden, tributary of Lake Lucerne

Latvia 
Gauja, a river in Latvia, formerly known as Livländische Aa
Lielupe, a river in Latvia, formerly known as Kurländische Aa

Science and technology 
 AA amyloidosis, a form of amyloidosis related to serum amyloid A
 Amino acid, often abbreviated aa when indicating positions in a peptide sequence (e.g., aa 120–150)
 Antiandrogen, a drug which blocks the effects of androgens
 Aplastic anemia, a rare disease
 Arachidonic acid, a polyunsaturated fatty acid
 Advanced Architecture, original name of Amiga Advanced Graphics Architecture
 Anti-aliasing, various techniques for mitigating certain signal processing artifacts
 Atlas Autocode, a computer programming language
 AA, a proprietary digital audio format of Audible.com
 Authoritative Answer, in DNS, a flag for a query answer
 AA postulate of Euclidean geometry
 Anti-aircraft, in military use
 Abampere (aA), the CGS unit of current
 Attoampere (aA), a unit of electric current equal to 10−18 Ampere
 AA tree, named after Arne Andersson
 AA, the abbreviation for azidoazide azide
 AppArmor

Sports 
 Double-A (baseball) or Class AA, a classification level in Minor League Baseball since 1912
 American Association (1882–1891), a professional baseball league in the United States from 1882 to 1891
 American Association (1902–1997), a professional baseball league in the United States from 1902 to 1962 and 1969 to 1997
 American Association of Professional Baseball, a professional baseball league in the United States and Canada since 2006
 Athletics Australia, national sporting organisation in Australia
 Amateur Athletic Union (1884-present), an organization in the U. S. that promotes amateur sports.

Transportation 
 AA Highway, a state highway in Northern Kentucky
 Ann Arbor Railroad (1895–1976), a defunct railroad in Ohio and Michigan
 Ann Arbor Railroad (1988), a railroad operating in Ohio and Michigan
 K line, a defunct line on the New York City Subway, formerly called "AA"
 NZR AA class, a locomotive class operated by the New Zealand Railways Department

Other uses 
 African American, as a cultural identity
 Asian Aerospace, an airshow in Asia
 Associate of Arts, an academic degree
 European Union Association Agreement
 Postal abbreviation for United States armed forces in the Americas
 Japanese internet slang for Shift JIS art
 Internet slang for ASCII Art

See also 
 A (disambiguation)
 Å (disambiguation)
 Aach (toponymy)
 AAA (disambiguation)
 AAAA (disambiguation)
 Aabach (disambiguation)
 Grosse Aa (disambiguation)
 Kleine Aa (disambiguation)
 A Aa, a film
 Automobile Association (disambiguation)